N.U.D.E.@ Natural Ultimate Digital Experiment is a life simulation video game released for the Xbox and is only released in Japan. It is a simulation-style game in which the player assumes the role of tester for a new product. This product is a female humanoid robot called P.A.S.S., or Personal Assist Secretary System. This robot has a very basic amount of functionality to start, and must be taught language and taught how to complete tasks. To accomplish this, the robot is issued voice commands by the player using the included headset, the Xbox Communicator. The Xbox's internal clock keeps track of time, which affects gameplay in various ways.

The game is similar in concept to the Sega Dreamcast game Seaman where the player interacts with an avatar via voice.

N.U.D.E.@ Natural Ultimate Digital Experiment was announced on September 19, 2002 and a promotional video was shown at the 2002 Tokyo Game Show.

References

External links
 Xbox.com product page (archived) 
 Game information at Softbank Games 

2003 video games
Bishōjo games
Japan-exclusive video games
Life simulation games
Video games about mecha
Microphone-controlled computer games
Microsoft games
Red Entertainment games
Video games developed in Japan
Xbox games
Xbox-only games